The Very Private Life of Mister Sim (original title: La Vie très privée de Monsieur Sim; also known as The Terrible Privacy of Mr. Sim) is a 2015 French comedy-drama film directed by Michel Leclerc and starring Jean-Pierre Bacri. It is an adaptation of the 2010 novel The Terrible Privacy of Maxwell Sim by English author Jonathan Coe. It was released in France on 16 December 2015.

Cast 

 Jean-Pierre Bacri as François Sim 
 Isabelle Gélinas as Caroline
 Vimala Pons as Poppy
 Sixtine Dutheil as Lucy 
 Christian Bouillette as Jacques Sim 
 Vincent Lacoste as Jacques Sim (20 years old)
 Félix Moati as Francis
 Carole Franck as Audrey
 Jeanne Cherhal as Emmanuelle (voice)
 Mathieu Amalric as Samuel
 Valeria Golino as Luigia
 Linh Dan Pham as Liam
 Venantino Venantini as Monsieur Matteotti
 Francine Olivier as Madame Matteotti  
 Daniel Di Grazia as François Sim (19 years old)
 Patrick d'Assumçao as Neighbour on the plane
 Daniel-Jean Colloredo as Gabriel
 François Bureloup as Patrio Biobuccal 
 Jean-Pierre Lorit as Lino (50 years old) 
 Lucile Krier as Luigia (18 years old)

Accolades

References

External links 
 

2015 films
2015 comedy-drama films
2010s French-language films
French comedy-drama films
Films based on British novels
Films directed by Michel Leclerc
2010s French films